The Michael and Magdealena Bixler Farmstead, also known as John Rudy County Park, is a historic property located at East Manchester Township, Pennsylvania, York County, Pennsylvania. It includes seven stone and frame buildings dating from about 1799 to about 1910. They are a Georgian-style house, Sweitzer barn (1811), a summer kitchen, corn barn, hog barn, tobacco barn, and milk house. The house was built about 1799, and is a 2 1/2-story, stone dwelling on a limestone foundation. It has a slate covered gable roof. Also on the property is a hand-dug well dating to about 1799 or earlier, the foundations of a house dated to about 1737, and a smokehouse. The property was donated to York County in 1973, and is operated as a county park.

It was added to the National Register of Historic Places in 2000.

References

External links
John Rudy County Park website

Houses completed in 1799
Farms on the National Register of Historic Places in Pennsylvania
Georgian architecture in Pennsylvania
Houses in York County, Pennsylvania
National Register of Historic Places in York County, Pennsylvania